Constituency WR-05 is a reserved seat for women in the Khyber Pakhtunkhwa Assembly.

See also
 Constituency PK-53 (Mansehra-I)
 Constituency PK-54 (Mansehra-II)
 Constituency PK-55 (Mansehra-III)
 Constituency PK-56 (Mansehra-IV)
 Constituency PK-57 (Mansehra-V)

References

Khyber Pakhtunkhwa Assembly constituencies
Women in Pakistan